Tore Pryser (born 9 January 1945) is a Norwegian historian who has served as professor at the Lillehammer University College since 1993.

Born in Oslo, he took a cand.philol. degree at the University of Oslo. He was appointed at the Lillehammer University College in 1975, became associate professor in 1978, and was promoted to professor in 1993.

Pryser has specialized in several fields. In the field of Norwegian nineteenth- and twentieth-century history, his 1985 tome Norsk historie 1800–1870. Frå standssamfunn til klassesamfunn is influential. In 1999 it was republished in an abridged version, Norsk historie 1814–1860, Frå standssamfunn mot klassesamfunn, as volume four of Samlagets norske historie, a series on Norwegian history spanning the years 800 to 2000. As the title indicates, Pryser's book has a social perspective on the period.

In the field of Norwegian labor history, his publications include Klassebevegelse eller folkebevegelse? En sosialhistorisk undersøkelse av thranittene i Ullensaker (1977, an expanded version of his master's degree thesis) and Klassen og nasjonen 1935-1946 (1988, volume four of Arbeiderbevegelsens historie i Norge). The 1991 work Arbeiderbevegelsen og Nasjonal Samling explores the connection between parts of the worker's movement and Nasjonal Samling, the Norwegian Fascist party which during the German occupation of Norway from 1940 to 1945 was the only legal party in Norway. Other war-related publications include Fra varm til kald krig (1994) and Hitlers hemmelige agenter: tysk etterretning i Norge 1939-1945 (2001). Pryser also contributed to the Norsk krigsleksikon 1940–45, an encyclopedia published in 1995.

Following Hitlers hemmelige agenter in 2001, Pryser has done his research mainly on foreign intelligence in Norway during and after the Second World War. His project mainly led up to Tyske hemmelige tjenester i Norden, a large work on German intelligence in the Nordic countries which was released in late 2012. By-products of the project include the books Kvinner i hemmelige tjenester: etterretning i Norden under den annen verdenskrig (2008, translated into Swedish), USAs hemmelige agenter : den amerikanske etteretningstjenesten OSS i Norden under andre verdenskrig (2010), Svik og gråsoner: norske spioner under 2. verdenskrig (2010) and "Varulven" og andre agenthistorier: svik og gråsoner under 2. verdenskrig (2011).

As a historian of Norway during World War II, Pryser has been critical to several historiographical aspects of the period. The importance of several resistance members, hailed as heroes after the end of war, has, according to Pryser, been exaggerated for nation-building purposes. He has also stated that several companies went largely unpunished for their economic cooperation, so-called "economic high treason", with the German occupants.

References

1945 births
Living people
20th-century Norwegian historians
Labor historians
Norwegian military historians
Historians of World War II
University of Oslo alumni
Academic staff of Lillehammer University College
Writers from Oslo
21st-century Norwegian historians